Dysschema thetis, the northern giant flag moth, is a moth of the family Erebidae. The species was first described by Johann Christoph Friedrich Klug in 1836. It is found from the south-western United States to north-western Mexico.

The wingspan is 85–95 mm.

The larvae feed on Asteraceae species.

Taxonomy
Dysschema thetis and Dysschema mariamne have historically been regarded as synonyms; however, the lectotype of thetis belongs to the same population historically known as D. howardi, therefore making these two synonyms, while mariamne is the correct name for the more southern species.

References

Moths described in 1836
Dysschema